Lloyd N. Morrisett could refer to: 

Lloyd N. Morrisett Sr. (1892-1981), American educator
Lloyd N. Morrisett Jr. (1929-2023), American psychologist and son of Lloyd N. Morrisett Sr.

The phrase "Lloyd N. Morrisett, Professor and Associate Dir., Education Program, U. of Calif." appeared in one of the lists of Richard Nixon's political opponents, commonly referred to as his "Enemies List". There is some amibiguity over whether "Lloyd N. Morrisett" refers to Lloyd N. Morrisett Sr. or Lloyd N. Morrisett Jr., though Morrisett Jr. has stated that be believed it to be referring to himself.

References